Hydroscapha is a genus of beetles endemic to Europe and the United States. It contains these species:

 Hydroscapha coomani Löbl, 1994
 Hydroscapha crotchi Sharp, 1874
 Hydroscapha granulum (Motschulsky, 1855)
 Hydroscapha gyrinoides Aube
 Hydroscapha hunanensis
 Hydroscapha jaechi Löbl, 1994
 Hydroscapha jumaloni Sato, 1972
 Hydroscapha mauretanica Peyerimhoff, 1922
 Hydroscapha monticola Löbl, 1994
 Hydroscapha natans LeConte, 1874
 Hydroscapha nepalensis Löbl, 1994
 Hydroscapha reichardti Löbl, 1994
 Hydroscapha saboureaui Paulian, 1949
 Hydroscapha satoi Löbl, 1994
 Hydroscapha sharpi Reitter, 1887
 Hydroscapha substrigosa Champion, 1920
 Hydroscapha takahashii Miwa, 1934
 Hydroscapha turbinata Champion, 1925

References

External links

Hydroscapha at Fauna Europaea

Myxophaga genera